William Harold Johnson (first ¼ 1916 – 13 June 1997) was a Welsh rugby union and  professional rugby league footballer who played in the 1930s.

Background
Bill Johnson's birth was registered in Newport district, Monmouthshire, he was the son of Thomas D. Johnson, and Elizabeth Francis, whose marriage was registered during second ¼ 1915 in  Newport district, Monmouthshire, he died aged 82.

Playing career

International honours
Bill Johnson won a cap for Wales while at Huddersfield in 1938, and won a cap for England in 1941.

County Cup Final appearances
Bill Johnson played , i.e. number 2, in Huddersfield's 18–10 victory over Hull F.C. in the 1938–39 Yorkshire County Cup Final during the 1938–39 season at Odsal Stadium, Bradford on Saturday 22 October 1938.

References

1916 births
1997 deaths
England national rugby league team players
Huddersfield Giants players
Newport RFC players
Pill Harriers RFC players
Place of death missing
Rugby league halfbacks
Rugby league players from Newport, Wales
Rugby league wingers
Rugby union players from Newport, Wales
Wales national rugby league team players
Welsh rugby league players
Welsh rugby union players